In geometry, the deltoidal icositetrahedron (or trapezoidal icositetrahedron, tetragonal icosikaitetrahedron, tetragonal trisoctahedron, strombic icositetrahedron) is a Catalan solid. Its 24 faces are congruent kites. The deltoidal icositetrahedron, whose dual is the (uniform) rhombicuboctahedron, is tightly related to the pseudo-deltoidal icositetrahedron, whose dual is the pseudorhombicuboctahedron; but the actual and pseudo-d.i. are not to be confused with each other.

Cartesian coordinates 

In the image above, the long body diagonals are those between opposite red vertices and between opposite blue vertices, and the short body diagonals are those between opposite yellow vertices.Cartesian coordinates for the vertices of the deltoidal icositetrahedron centered at the origin and with long body diagonal length 2 are:
red vertices (lying in -fold symmetry axes):

blue vertices (lying in -fold symmetry axes):

yellow vertices (lying in -fold symmetry axes):

For example, the point with coordinates  is the intersection of the plane with equation  and of the line with system of equations 

A deltoidal icositetrahedron has three regular-octagon equators, lying in three orthogonal planes.

Dimensions and angles

Dimensions 
The deltoidal icositetrahedron with long body diagonal length D = 2 has:
short body diagonal length:

long edge length:

short edge length:

inradius:

 is the distance from the center to any face plane; it may be calculated by normalizing the equation of plane above, replacing (x, y, z) with (0, 0, 0), and taking the absolute value of the result.

A deltoidal icositetrahedron has its long and short edges in the ratio:

The deltoidal icositetrahedron with short edge length  has:
area:

volume:

Angles 
For a deltoidal icositetrahedron, each kite face has:
three equal acute angles, with value:

one obtuse angle (between the short edges), with value:

Occurrences in nature and culture 
The deltoidal icositetrahedron is a crystal habit often formed by the mineral analcime and occasionally garnet. The shape is often called a trapezohedron in mineral contexts, although in solid geometry the name trapezohedron has another meaning.

Orthogonal projections 
The deltoidal icositetrahedron has three symmetry positions, all centered on vertices:

Related polyhedra 
The deltoidal icositetrahedron's projection onto a cube divides its squares into quadrants. The projection onto a regular octahedron divides its equilateral triangles into kite faces. In Conway polyhedron notation this represents an ortho operation to a cube or octahedron. 

The deltoidal icositetrahedron (dual of the small rhombicuboctahedron) is tightly related to the disdyakis dodecahedron (dual of the great rhombicuboctahedron). The main difference is that the latter also has edges between the vertices on 3- and 4-fold symmetry axes (between yellow and red vertices in the images below).

Dyakis dodecahedron 
A variant with pyritohedral symmetry is called a dyakis dodecahedron or diploid. It is common in crystallography.A dyakis dodecahedron can be created by enlarging 24 of the 48 faces of a disdyakis dodecahedron. A tetartoid can be created by enlarging 12 of the 24 faces of a dyakis dodecahedron.

Stellation 
The great triakis octahedron is a stellation of the deltoidal icositetrahedron.

Related polyhedra and tilings 
The deltoidal icositetrahedron is a member of a family of duals to the uniform polyhedra related to the cube and regular octahedron.

When projected onto a sphere (see right), it can be seen that the edges make up the edges of a cube and regular octahedron arranged in their dual positions. It can also be seen that the 3- and 4-fold corners can be made to have the same distance to the center. In that case the resulting icositetrahedron will no longer have a rhombicuboctahedron for a dual, since the centers of the square and triangle faces of a rhombicuboctahedron are at different distances from its center.

This polyhedron is a term of a sequence of topologically related deltoidal polyhedra with face configuration V3.4.n.4; this sequence continues with tilings of the Euclidean and hyperbolic planes. These face-transitive figures have (*n32) reflectional symmetry.

See also 
 Deltoidal hexecontahedron
 Tetrakis hexahedron, another 24-face Catalan solid which looks a bit like an overinflated cube.
 "The Haunter of the Dark", a story by H.P. Lovecraft, whose plot involves this figure.
 Pseudo-deltoidal icositetrahedron

References 

 (Section 3-9)
 (The thirteen semiregular convex polyhedra and their duals, Page 23, Deltoidal icositetrahedron)
The Symmetries of Things 2008, John H. Conway, Heidi Burgiel, Chaim Goodman-Strass,   (Chapter 21, Naming the Archimedean and Catalan polyhedra and tilings, page 286, tetragonal icosikaitetrahedron)

External links 

Deltoidal (Trapezoidal) Icositetrahedron – Interactive Polyhedron model

Catalan solids